Bunești is a commune located in Vâlcea County, Romania. It is composed of six villages: Bunești, Coasta Mare, Firești, Râpănești, Teiusu and Titireci. It is situated in the historical region of Oltenia.

References

Communes in Vâlcea County
Localities in Oltenia